The 1990 International Rules Series was the fourth series between Australian rules footballers from Australia and Gaelic footballers from Ireland. The series took place in Australia and consisted of three test matches between the Australian and Irish international rules football teams. Ireland won the series by 2–1 and by 24 points over the three test matches.

Martin Gavigan was Ireland vice-captain.

Eugene McGee was in charge of the Irish team. Seán McCague was his assistant manager.

Brendan Hackett trained the Irish team.

Summary

First test
Venue: Waverley Park, Melbourne 
Crowd: 18,332

Second test
Venue: Bruce Stadium, Canberra 
Crowd: 7,000

Third test
Venue: WACA, Perth 
Crowd: 7,700

Beitzel Medal (Best player for the series) — Jack O’Shea (Ireland)

References

External links
 Australia v. Ireland since 1967
 Aussie Rules International: The 'Last' Test Series – 1990
 GAA: International Rules - Series 4 - 1990 – Australia

International Rules Series
International Rules Series
International Rules series
International sports competitions hosted by Australia